Hakö is an Austronesian language of Buka Island, Papua New Guinea.

External links 
 Materials on Hakö are included in the open access Arthur Capell  (AC2) and Malcolm Ross (MR1) collections held by Paradisec.

References

Northwest Solomonic languages
Languages of Papua New Guinea
Languages of the Autonomous Region of Bougainville